Mosafer (literally  Passenger) is a 2000 television series broadcast by the IRIB network. The director, producer and script-writer are Siroos Moghaddam and Mostafa Azizi.

summary 
It all starts when Great Ipakchi (Atash Taghipoor) begins to feel guilt while dying. 25 years ago the wedding celebration of old man daughter was interrupted by him due to his stubbornness. His son-in-law (Jamal Ejlali) is jailed after couple of years and his wife dies while giving birth to their daughter, Afsane (Anahita Nemati). The father is released after Iranian Revolution and starts to live with Afsane, quitting her forever from Ipakchi's life. Now, after many years passed, the grandfather, Ipakchi, is guilty and he wants to compensate. So he asks his France-based grandson, Reza (Danial Hakimi), to return and find Afsane and give her all the fortune that is her mother's share. Reza starts his search and the process he gets to know Manije (Pantea Bahram), Afsane's friend as a child. Manije lives with his father (Kiomars Malak Motiyi), mother (Sedighe Kianfar), brother (Hamid Mahindoost) and sister-in-law (Sanaz Samavati) who are all addicted and outlaws. When they found out there is much money to be won, they join Majid, Manije's uncle, (Abolfazl Poorarab) to plan this. Majid is also an outlaw and addicted and has many plans for Afsane. She has become a doctor and works in a hospital. The Chairman of Hospital, Dr.Saremi (Hamidreza Afshar), wants to marry Afsane and Afsane's friend (Shiva Ebrahimi) is aware of this. Dr. Saremi tries to expose Majid plans but Majid, together with his relatives and Kamran (Fardad Safakhoo), a friend, goes on until...

Cast
Abolfazl Poorarab as Majid Sahrayi
Anahita Nemati as Afsane Yaghoobi
Pantea Bahram as Manije Khakbaz
Danial Hakimi as Reza
Jamal Ejlali as Ebrahim Yaghoobi
Hamid Reza Afshar as Dr. Saremi
Laya Bastani as Soori
Shiva Ebrahimi as Mahboobe Asadi
Sedigheh Kianfar as Ms. Khakbaz
Hamid Mahindoost as Hamid Khakbaz
Kiumars Malekmotei as Mr. Khakbaz
Ala Mohseni as Police Investigator
Arash Azizi as Informer

External links
 

Iranian television series
2000s Iranian television series
2000 Iranian television series debuts
Islamic Republic of Iran Broadcasting original programming